Kogalym Airport  is an airport in Khanty-Mansi Autonomous Okrug, Russia located 9 km southeast of Kogalym. It accommodates medium-sized airliners.

History
After being state-owned by the Soviet union, the airport started to operate privately in 1991, and served as home base for the defunct airline Kogalymavia. In 1995, Kogalym Airport obtained its international status and served its first international flight (to Budapest) in 1996. In 1998, it became a member of the Airports Council International Europe.

Airlines and destinations

References

External links
  Kogalym Airport official website

Airports built in the Soviet Union
Airports in Khanty-Mansi Autonomous Okrug